Luke Robinson (born 20 October 1998) is a Bermudan footballer who currently plays as a forward for Whitehawk in England and the Bermudan international side.

Club career
After coming through the Southampton Second Chance Programme and Brighton & Hove Albion's academy, Robinson's career started with Peacehaven & Telscombe, followed by brief spells at Lewes and Bognor Regis Town before a serious knee injury restricted his appearances at Haywards Heath Town.

Robinson joined Staines Town for the 2020-2021 season. He scored a hat-trick in a 4-4 draw with South Park on 17 October 2020  and was named Supporters' Player of the Season. 

Robinson made his international debut for Bermuda against Surinam on 4 June 2021 in a World Cup qualifier, and started again against Cayman Islands four days later. He has also appeared in the Gold Cup.

Robinson joined Horsham on 30 July 2021 after impressing in pre-season. 
Robinson then re-signed for Haywards Heath Town,  before moving to Worthing in December 2021 and then signing joint registration forms with Bognor Regis Town on 15 August 2022.

On 17 December 2022 Luke ended his joint registration with Bognor Regis Town and joined Whitehawk, scoring on his debut at Three Bridges,followed by a stoppage time winner against Haywards Heath Town.

Career statistics

Club

Notes

International

References

1998 births
Living people
Bermudian footballers
Bermuda international footballers
English footballers
Association football forwards
Brighton & Hove Albion F.C. players
Peacehaven & Telscombe F.C. players
Lewes F.C. players
Bognor Regis Town F.C. players
Haywards Heath Town F.C. players
Staines Town F.C. players
Horsham F.C. players
Worthing F.C. players
Whitehawk F.C. players